The Cryptomycocolacomycetes are a class of fungi in the Pucciniomycotina subdivision of the Basidiomycota. The class contains a single order, the Cryptomycocolacales, which in turn contains the single family Cryptomycocolacaceae. The family has two monotypic genera.

References

Basidiomycota classes
Monotypic fungus taxa
Pucciniomycotina
Taxa named by Franz Oberwinkler